Ira Magaziner (born November 8, 1947) is an American advisor. He was born in New York City, New York, US. After being a student activist and business consultant, Magaziner became the senior advisor for policy development for President Clinton, especially as chief healthcare policy advisor. He now serves in a leadership capacity for two of the Bill, Hillary & Chelsea Clinton Foundation's international development initiatives, which are at the forefront of non-governmental organizations in addressing global health and environmental issues.

Student activism 
During his college years at Brown University, Magaziner was one of the two architects of the "New Curriculum", a liberal academic approach which eliminates core requirements outside of the concentration the student pursues. Magaziner excelled academically at Brown and in 1969 was named valedictorian of his class.

During the 1968 black student walkout at the University, Magaziner held rallies in support of their demands, and as president of the Undergraduate Council of Students, he negotiated with the administration on the terms of their return. His valedictory address at graduation was featured in a 1969 Life magazine special on student leaders—a special which also included a story about a recent Wellesley College graduate, future First Lady, New York Senator, and Secretary of State Hillary Rodham. After his address, Magaziner led the students in turning their backs on Henry Kissinger, who was receiving an honorary degree. Magaziner also organized Brown's Spring Weekend concerts and festivities.

He was named a Rhodes Scholar upon graduation and studied political philosophy and economics under Isaiah Berlin at Balliol College of the University of Oxford. While studying at Oxford, Magaziner met Bill Clinton, also a Rhodes Scholar, who would become a close friend and eventually boss in the 1990s. After two years, Magaziner left the program without earning a degree to organize protest rallies against the Vietnam War—at one point in cooperation with actress Vanessa Redgrave.

After Oxford, Magaziner and a group of former Brown students attempted to implement social democratic reforms in the city of Brockton, Massachusetts. These reforms included starting an agricultural cooperative, supporting liberal candidates for city council, strengthening the union movement, and printing a progressive town newspaper. Magaziner soon abandoned the project, after the group recognized that the effects of foreign business competition on the local manufacturing base would undercut their efforts. He then determined that a greater understanding of business was necessary to promote broad-based social and economic reforms.

Business consulting 
Magaziner went on to work for the Boston Consulting Group in Boston, London and Tokyo from 1973 to 1979. He founded Telesis in 1979, sold the company in 1986 to Towers Perrin Inc. and managed the U.S. strategy practice for Towers Perrin from 1986 to 1989. Throughout his consulting career, Magaziner's client list has included General Electric, Corning Glass, the Governments of Ireland and Sweden and other high-tech manufacturing and health care companies.

Magaziner also has had significant influence in Rhode Island. Working alongside Governor J. Joseph Garrahy, he devised a state economic plan, known as the "Greenhouse Compact", which, upon approval by the voters, aimed to resolve several key economic issues in the state, to create several business "incubators", and to stimulate state exports. While initially popular among state legislators, and some civic and business leaders, it was ultimately voted down by referendum. Magaziner and his family continue to support prominent Democratic Rhode Island politicians and other social causes, including the Rhode Island Food Bank.

Magaziner has authored two books on business strategy and industrial policy: Minding America's Business and The Silent War. The former, co-authored with future Clinton Secretary of Labor Robert Reich, laid out a plan for U.S. industrial policy in the late 1970s and early 1980s, and received critical acclaim. Emphasis was placed on eliminating subsidies for inefficient American industries, and applying fiscal and industrial policy strategies to stimulate growth in sectors for which the U.S. had "cost-advantage." The Silent War, co-authored with Providence Journal columnist Mark Patinkin, tells the story of international business competition in the early 1990s, and Magaziner's experiences in dealing with different countries' relationships to their corporate base.

The Clinton years 
Magaziner is best known for leading, along with Hillary Clinton, the failed Task Force to Reform Health Care in the early Clinton administration, which aimed to implement a managed competition regime for the health insurance industry, and to establish community rated insurance pools to cut costs for small businesses and the uninsured. The plan was widely criticized for being too complex. Pharmaceutical companies and health insurance companies waged a broad-based ad-campaign against the plan, which included the famous "Harry and Louise" ads. Despite the attacks by Republicans and industry associations, Magaziner did little to respond. People within the administration criticized Magaziner's blunt and domineering approach, attacking critics who disagreed instead of trying to build consensus.

Brad DeLong, Deputy Treasury Secretary for the Clinton administration at the time, argues that Magaziner's failures stemmed from having a background in management consulting instead of policy: "A management consultant's principal goal is to win a debate in front of his employer ... by making intellectual arguments, controlling the flow of information..., [and] walling-off potential adversaries from the process ... You develop a policy by forming a large coalition ... Then you have a large group of people who are enthusiastic about the proposal: they will go out and make your arguments for you."

Magaziner was court ordered to pay $285,864 to the Association of American Physicians and Surgeons, in 1997 by a federal judge for alleged cover up of whether the Task Force to Reform Health Care hired non-governmental employees and therefore had to release documents from their strategic deliberations upon public request. Magaziner was subsequently cleared of all allegations and the fine was overturned by unanimous decision of the United States Court of Appeals on August 25, 1999.

Magaziner stayed in the administration and worked to develop an E-Commerce policy initiative with OSTP staff and industry advisors. That initiative evolved to include a facilitative role in the formation of the Internet Corporation for Assigned Names and Numbers to assume Internet administrative activities previously maintained by the US DARPA.

Clinton Health Access Initiative 
Since 2002, Magaziner is the chief executive officer and vice chairman of the Clinton Health Access Initiative (CHAI), which works to save lives in low and middle income countries by helping people gain access to essential medicines and health services.

Personal life 
Magaziner lives in Bristol, Rhode Island, with his wife Suzanne. He has three children: Seth, Jonathan, and Sarah. Seth Magaziner was elected General Treasurer of Rhode Island in 2014. On September 14, 2021, Seth announced his candidacy for governor, focusing on issues that included women's rights, clean energy, reducing gun violence, fiscal responsibility, pandemic response and school improvement.

Magaziner repeatedly flew on Jeffrey Epstein’s jets and his personal phone number and private email were in Epstein’s “black book.”

References

External links 

1947 births
Living people
20th-century American Jews
American nonprofit chief executives
American Rhodes Scholars
Boston Consulting Group people
Brown University alumni
Clinton Foundation people
Lawrence High School (Cedarhurst, New York) alumni
People from Bristol, Rhode Island
People from The Five Towns, New York
21st-century American Jews